Old Massett, named G̱aw in X̱aad kíl, is an Indigenous Canadian village on Graham Island in Haida Gwaii, British Columbia.  It lies on the east side of Masset Sound close to the town of Masset; the area of land it is on is legally designated Masset Indian Reserve No. 1, or Masset 1.  The original name of the settlement was Uttewas, meaning "white-slope village" in the Haida language.  It is populated by Haida people of both Ḵuustak, the Eagle matrilineage, and Ḵayx̱al, the Raven matrilineage. The town is administered by the Old Massett Village Council.  Its population has fluctuated over the last one hundred and fifty years; smallpox, especially the 1862 Pacific Northwest smallpox epidemic, drastically reduced its numbers in the late 1800s, but in 1968, it had over 1,000 people and was the largest village in Haida Gwaii.  In 2009, the Village Council counted 2,698 band members in the area; the 2016 census counted 555 living at the Old Massett townsite.

Culture

Old Massett is home to a number of totem poles:
Chief Matthews pole by Reg Davidson
Geoffrey White Memorial pole by Christian White 
 Medicine pole by Christian White
Morris White pole by Christian White 
Skilay (Ernie Collison) by Jim Hart
Family Center pole by Vernon White
New Town poles by Todd and Derek White
Hospital poles by Jordan Seward and Cooper Wilson
Old Massett poles by Donnie Edenshaw and Jaalen Edenshaw
Playing field poles by Lawrence Bell
Morris White memorial pole by Jim Hart and Christian White
St John's Church pole by Robert Davidson
Amanda Edgar's memorial pole by Paul White 
Sharkhouse pole by Reg Davidson
gyaaGang Monumental pole by Kilthguulans Christian White

Popular culture
Some Old Massett artists star on the Knowledge Network television series Ravens and Eagles.

References

External links 

 Language notes, First Peoples' Language Map of British Columbia

Haida villages